David the Invincible (or David the Philosopher) was a neoplatonist philosopher of the 6th century.

David was a pupil of Olympiodorus in Alexandria. His works, originally written in Greek, survive in medieval Armenian translation, and he was given the byname of "invincible" (Classical ; reformed:) in the Armenian tradition, which considers David himself an Armenian.

Due to confusion with other authors called David and due to an abundant body of medieval legend, almost nothing is known with certainty about the historical David. Armenian tradition makes him a native of Taron,  but this is not substantiated in contemporary sources and may be due to conflation with another person. 
He was active in Alexandria in Byzantine Egypt, known as an expert in Aristotle's Physics. 
He supposedly received the byname "invincible" for his exceptional oratory and argumentative skills.  David is said to have returned to his native Armenia later in life, where he was active as a teacher, but he was persecuted by the church and ultimately died in exile in Haghbat.

Of the number of works attributed to him, many are pseudepigraphic or doubtful. 
The works which can be attributed to him with certainty or at least with some plausibility are not scholarly treatises but propedeutic (introductory) handbooks for use in teaching beginners.
They were composed in Greek but survive only in Armenian translation.
Philologically, these translations are important representatives of the "Hellenizing" tradition in Armenian literature (Yownaban Dproc‘) of the 6th to 8th centuries.

The David Anhaght Medal, the highest-ranking medal granted by the Armenian Academy of Philosophy, is named after him. David the Invincible (Դավիթ Անհաղթ - David Anhaght, Armenfilm) is a  1978 film by Levon Mkrtchyan.

References

Bibliography 

  
 

6th-century philosophers
Commentators on Aristotle
Armenian philosophers